Following is a list of Italian painters (in alphabetical order) who are notable for their art.

A

Niccolò dell'Abbate (1509/12–1571)
Giuseppe Abbati (1836–1868)
Angiolo Achini (1850–1930)
Pietro Adami (c. 1730)
Livio Agresti (1508–1580)
Giorgio Matteo Aicardi (1891–1985)
Francesco Albani (1578–1660)
Giacomo Alberelli (1600–1650)
Mariotto Albertinelli (1474–1515)
Ambrogio Antonio Alciati (1878–1929)
Domenico Alfani (1479/1480–c. 1553)
Girolamo Alibrandi (1470–1524)
Silvio Allason (1845–1912) 
Alessandro Allori (1535–1607)
Cristofano Allori (1577–1621)
Marco Almaviva (born 1934)
Altichiero (1330–1390)
Jaber Alwan (born 1948)
Jacopo Amigoni (1682–1752)
Giuseppe Amisani (1881–1941)
Andrea da Murano (active 1463–1502)
Andrea di Bartolo (1360/70–1428)
Fra Angelico (1387–1455)
Sofonisba Anguissola (1532–1625)
Pietro Annigoni (1910–1988)
Andrea Ansaldo (1584–1638)
Michelangelo Anselmi (c. 1492–c. 1554)
Antonello da Messina (1430–1479)
Antonello de Saliba (1466–1535)
Antoniazzo Romano (1430–1510)
Andrea Appiani (1754–1817)
Alessandro Araldi (c. 1460–c. 1529) 
Giuseppe Arcimboldo (1527–1593)
Pellegrino Aretusi (c. 1460–1523)
Mino Argento (born 1927)
Amico Aspertini (c. 1474–1552)
Gioacchino Assereto) (1600–1649)

B

Francesco Bacchiacca (1494–1557)
Baciccio (Giovan Battista Gaulli) (1639–1709)
Sisto Badalocchio (1585–c. 1647]
Giuseppe Badaracco (1588–1647)
Antonio Badile (c. 1518–1560)
Alesso Baldovinetti (1425–1499)
Camillo Ballini (1540–c. 1592)
Cristiano Banti (1824–1904)
Jacopo de' Barbari (1460/70–1516)
Mario Bardi (1922–1998) 
Barna da Siena (fl. c. 1340)
Barnaba da Modena (1328–1386)
Federico Barocci (1526–1612)
Bartolo di Fredi (1330–1410)
Fra Bartolomeo (1472–1517)
Bartolomeo Veneto (fl. 1502–46)
Marco Basaiti (1470–1530)
Marco Antonio Bassetti (1586–1630)
Cesare Bassano (1584–1648)
Francesco da Ponte the 1st Bassano (c. 1475–1530)
Francesco Bassano the Younger (1549–1592)
Jacopo Bassano (1510–1592)
Leandro Bassano (1557–1622)
Lazzaro Bastiani (1429–1512)
Pompeo Batoni (1708–1787)
Domenico Beccafumi (1486–1551)
Gentile Bellini (1429–1507)
Giovanni Bellini (1430–1516)
Jacopo Bellini (1400–1470)
Luigi Benfatto (1551–1611) 
Ambrogio Bergognone (1453–1523)
Bonaventura Berlinghieri (1210–1287)
Berlinghiero Berlinghieri (1175–1236)
Giuseppe Bertini (1825–1898)
Francesco Bianchi (1447–1510)
Francesco Galli Bibiena (1659–1739)
Francesco Bissolo (1470/72–1554) 
Giovanni Battista Bissoni (1576–1636) 
Boccaccio Boccaccino (c. 1467–c. 1525)
Giovanni Boccati (1420–after 1480)
Giovanni Boccardi (?–1542)
Umberto Boccioni (1882–1916)
Giovanni Boldini (1842–1931)
Giovanni Antonio Boltraffio (1467–1516)
Benedetto Bonfigli (c. 1420–1496)
Bonifacio Veronese (Bonifacio de' Pitati) (1487–1553)
Giovanni Bonini (fl. 1320)
Bono da Ferrara (?–1461)
Francesco Bonsignori (c. 1455–1519)
Paris Bordone (1500–1571)
Guido Borelli (born 1952)
Odoardo Borrani (1833–1905)
Giuseppe Borsato (1771–1849)
Andrea Boscoli (c. 1560–c. 1606)
Erma Bossi (1875-1952)
Carlo Bossoli (1815–1884)
Giuseppe Bottero (1846–1930)
Sandro Botticelli (c. 1445–1510)
Francesco Botticini (1446–1498)
Raffaello Botticini (1474–1520)
Donato Bramante (1444–1514)
Bramantino (Bartolomeo Suardi) (c. 1455–c. 1536)   
Agnolo Bronzino (1503–1572)
Nicolao Branceleon (c. 1460–c. 1526)
Buonamico Buffalmacco (1290–1340)
Giuliano Bugiardini (1476–1555)
Niccolò di Buonaccorso (?–1388)
Bernardino Butinone (1450–1510)
Ludovico Buti (c. 1560–1611)

C

Vincenzo Cabianca (1827–1902)
Camillo Cabutti (1863–1922)
Guglielmo Caccia "il Moncalvo" (1568–1625)
Vicenzo Caccianemici (fl. 1530)
Giovanni Cadioli (c. 1710–1767)
Pio Caglieri (1848– ?)
Giuseppe Calcia (fl. 1725)
Bartolommeo Calomato (17th century)
Pietro Calzetta (fl. 1470–1500)
Luca Cambiasi (1527–1585)
Michele Cammarano (1835–1920)
Bartolomeo da Camogli (14th century)
Agostino Campanella (fl. 1770)
Galeazzo Campi (1475/1477–1536)
Vincenzo Campi (1536–1591)
Canaletto (1697–1768)
Bartolomeo Caporali (c. 1420–c. 1503/1505)
Aliprando Caprioli (fl. 1575–1599)
Domenico Caprioli (1494–1528)
Antonio Capulongo (16th century)
Cecco del Caravaggio (fl. c.1620)
Marco Cardisco (c.1486–c.1542)
Bartolomeo Carducci (1560–1608)
Luca Carlevarijs (1663–1730)
Giulio Carmignani (1813–1890)
Fra Simone da Carnuli (fl. 1519)
Paolo Carosone (born 1941)
Agostino Carracci (1557–1602)
Annibale Carracci (1560–1609)
Ludovico Carracci (1555–1619)
Caravaggio (1573–1610)
Fernando Carcupino (1922–2003)
Andrea Carlone (1626–1697)
Giovanni Battista Carlone (1603–1684)
Giovanni Bernardo Carlone (1590–1630)
Domenico Carnovale (fl. 1564)
Carpaccio (c. 1460–c. 1525)
Domenico Carpinoni (1566–1658)
Rosalba Carriera (1675–1757)
Felice Casorati (1883–1963)
Stefano Cassiani (1636–1714)
Andrea del Castagno (1421–1457)
Raffaelle Castellini (d. 1864)
Fabrizio Castello (c.1486–c.1542)
Vincenzo Catena (1470–1531)
Pasquale Cati (1550–1620)
Paoluccio Cattamara (fl. 1718)
Giovanni Paolo Cavagna (c. 1550–1627)
Bernardo Cavallino (1616–1656)
Giacomo Cavedone (1577–1660)
Paolo Caylina the Younger (16th century)
Rodolfo Ceccotti (born 1945)
Adriano Cecioni (1836–1886)
Quinto Cenni (1845–1917)
Giulia Centurelli (1832–1872)
Giacomo Ceruti (1698–1767)
Giovanni Maria Cerva (17th century)
Tito Chelazzi (1834–1892)
Giorgio de Chirico (1888–1978)
Michele Ciampanti (?–1510)
Carlo Cignani (1628–1719)
Giambettino Cignaroli (1706–1770)
Cimabue (1240–1302)
 Marco Cingolani (1961)
Vincenzo Civerchio (1470–1544)
Sigismondo Coccapani (1585–1643)
Leonardo Coccorante (1680–1750)
Colantonio (c. 1420–c.1460)
Piergiorgio Colautti (born 1934)
Michele Coltellini (1480–1542)
Giacomo Coltrini (16th century)
Cima da Conegliano (c.1459–c.1517)
Jacopo Coppi (1523–1591)
Leonardo Corona (1561–1605)
Correggio (1494–1534)
Hermann David Salomon Corrodi (1844–1905)
Niccolò Corso (1446–c. 1512) 
Pietro da Cortona (1596–1669)
Francesco del Cossa (1436–1478)
Giovanni Costa (1826–1903)
Lorenzo Costa (1460–1535)
Carlo Cozza (c. 1700–1769)
Giovanni Battista Crema (1883–1964)
Daniele Crespi (1598–1630)
Giovan Battista Crespi (il Cerano) (1573–1632)
Giuseppe Maria Crespi (Lo Spagnuolo) (1665–1747)
Donato Creti (1671–1749)
Carlo Crivelli (1430–1495)
Vittore Crivelli (1440–1502)
Baldassare Croce (1558–1628)
Francesco Curradi (1570–1661)

D

Bernardo Daddi (c. 1280–1348)
Pino Daeni (1939–2010)
Ottaviano da Faenza (14th century)
Vito D'Ancona (1825–1884)
Cosmo D'Angeli (1889–1968)
Daniele da Volterra (c.1509 –1566)
Giuseppe De Sanctis (1858–1924)
Serafino De Tivoli (1826–1892)
Giorgio De Vincenzi (1884–1965)
Luigi Deleidi (1784–1853)
Francesco Denanto (fl. 1520–1532)
Beppe Devalle (1940–2013)
Antonio DeVity (1901–1993)
Fra Diamante (c.1430–c.1498)
Carlo Dolci (1616–1686)
Domenichino (1581–1641)
Domenico di Bartolo (c. 1400/1404–1445/1447)
Domenico di Zanobi (active 1460–1481)
Domenico Veneziano (c.1410–1461)
Enrico Donati (1909–2008)
Dosso Dossi (c. 1490–1542)
Giuseppe Drugman (1810–1846)
Duccio (1255–1319)

F

Giovanni Fattori (1825–1908)
Martino Ferabosco (17th century)
Floriano Ferramola (c. 1478–1528)
Defendente Ferrari (1480/85–1540)
Gaudenzio Ferrari (1471–1546)
Antonio Ferrigno (1863–1940)
Domenico Fetti (1589–1623)
Domenico Fiasella (1589–1669)
Marcello Figolino (15th century)
Francesco Filippini (1853–1895)
Lavinia Fontana (1552–1614)
Michele Foschini (1711–c. 1770)
Vincenzo Foppa (1430–1515)
Marcantonio Franceschini (1648–1729)
Francesco Francia (1447–1517)
Giorgio Fuentes (1756–1821) 
Bernardino Fungai (1460–1516)

G

Agnolo Gaddi (1350–1396)
Taddeo Gaddi (c. 1300–1366)
Enrico Gamba (1831–1883)
Francesco Gamba (1818–1887)
Lattanzio Gambara (c. 1530–1574) 
Salvatore Garau (born 1953)
Enrico Garff (born 1939)
Domenico Gargiulo aka Micco Spadaro (1609–1610–ca. 1675)
Bartolomeo Gennari (1594–1661)
Gentile da Fabriano (c. 1370–1427)
Artemisia Gentileschi (1593–1652)
Orazio Gentileschi (1563–1639)
Tommaso Gherardini (1715–1797)
Davide Ghirlandaio (1452–1525)
Domenico Ghirlandaio (1449–1494)
Ridolfo Ghirlandaio (1483–1561)
Giampietrino (c. 1495–1549)
Corrado Giaquinto (1703–1765)
Camillo Gioja Barbera (19th century)
Luca Giordano (1634–1705)
Giorgione (c. 1477–1510)
Giotto (1267–1337)
Giovanni da Milano (fl. 1346–1369)
Giovanni da Rimini (fl. 1292–1336)
Giovanni d'Alemagna (1411–1450)
Giovanni del Biondo (fl. 1356–1399)
Giovanni di Paolo (1398–1482)
Giovanni di ser Giovanni Guidi (1406–1486)
Gerolamo Giovenone (1487–1555)
Girolamo da Carpi (1501–1556)
Giunta Pisano (1190–1258)
Benozzo Gozzoli (1421–1497)
il Grechetto (Giovanni Benedetto Castiglione) (1609–1664)
Giuseppe Grisoni (1699–1796)
Francesco Guardi (1712–1793)
Gianantonio Guardi (1699–1760)
Guercino (1591–1666)
Amanzia Guérillot (1828–1905)
Guido da Siena (1230–1290)
Bartolomeo Guidobono (1654–1709)
Renato Guttuso (1911–1987)

H

Francesco Hayez (1791–1882)

I

Domenico Induno (1815–1878)
Gerolamo Induno (1825–1890)
Innocenzo da Imola (1490–1550)

J

Jacopo del Casentino (1297–1349)

L

Girolamo Lamanna (1580–1640)
Carlo Lamparelli (fl. 1680)
Giovanni Lanfranco (1582–1647)
Bernardino Lanini (1511–c.1578)
Pietro Lauri (17th century)
Bice Lazzari (1900–1981)
Gregorio Lazzarini (1655–1730)
Achille Lega (1899–1934)
Silvestro Lega (1826–1895)
Achille Leonardi (c. 1800–1870)
Pietro Giovanni Leonori (fl. 1400)
Liberale da Verona (1445–1530)
Gennesio Liberale (16th century)
Giovanni Antonio Licinio (c. 1515–1576)
Ulvi Liegi (1858–1939)
Cesare Ligario (1716–c. 1755)
Berto Linajuolo (15th century)
Filippino Lippi (1457–1504)
Fra Filippo Lippi (c. 1406–1469)
Giacomo Lippi (16th century)
Giovanni Battista Livizzani (17th century)
Giovanni Agostino da Lodi (c. 1470–c. 1519)
Barbara Longhi (1552–1638) 
Pietro Longhi (1701–1785)
Francesco Longo Mancini (1880–1954)
Ambrogio Lorenzetti (fl. 1319–1348)
Pietro Lorenzetti (1280–1348)
Paolo de Lorenzi (1733–after 1790)
Lorenzo di Credi (1459–1537) 
Lorenzo Monaco (1370–1425) 
Lorenzo Veneziano (fl. c.1370) 
Lorenzo Lotto (1480–1557) 
Luca di Tommè περ. 1330–1389) 
Bernardino Luini (1481–1532)

M

Angelo Maccagnino or Angelo da Siena (?–1456)
Enrico Maccioni (born 1940)
Macrino d'Alba (c. 1460–1465–c. 1510–1520)
Mario Mafai (1902–1965)
Aimo Maggi (1756–1793)
Alessandro Magnasco (1667–1749)
Bastiano Mainardi (1460–1513)
Matilde Malenchini (1779–1858)
Luigi Malice (born 1937)
Antonio Mancini (1852–1930)
Bartolomeo Manfredi (1582–1622)
Giovanni Mansueti (1465–1527)
Andrea Mantegna (c. 1431–1506)
Carlo Maratta (1625–1713)
Luigi Marchesi (1825–1862)
Luigi Marengo (1928–2010)
Margaritone d'Arezzo (fl. c. 1250–1290)
Carlo Maria Mariani (1931–2021)
Giovanni Maria Mariani (17th century)
Michele Marieschi (1710–1744)
Carlo Martini (1908–1958)
Simone Martini (1284–1344)
Guido Marzulli (born 1943)
Masaccio (1401–1428)
Maso di Banco (?–1348)
Masolino da Panicale (1383–1447)
Michele Mastellari
Master of the Bambino Vispo (early 15th century)
Master of the Osservanza Triptych (fl. 1425–1450)
Paolo de Matteis (c. 1662–1728)
Filippo Mazzola (1460–1505)
Ludovico Mazzolino (1480–c. 1528) 
Carla Carli Mazzucato (born 1935)
Pier Francesco Mazzucchelli "il Morazzone" (1573–1626)
Master of the Bambino Vispo (early 15th century)
Melozzo da Forlì (1438–1494)
Francesco Melzi (1491–1568/70)
Lippo Memmi (?–1356)
Vincenzo Meucci (1694–1766)
Michelangelo (1475–1564)
Vincenzo Milione (1735–1805)
Amedeo Modigliani (1884–1920)
Bartolomeo Montagna (1450–1523)
Jacopo da Montagnana (1440–1499)
Paolo Moranda Cavazzola (1486–1522) 
Giorgio Morandi (1890–1964)
Domenico Morelli (1823–1901)
Moretto da Brescia (c.1498–1554)
Emma Moretto (19th century)
Giovan Battista Moroni (1522–1579)
Quirizio di Giovanni da Murano (fl. 1460–1478)

N

Nardo di Cione (d. 1366) 
Ottaviano Nelli (1375–1444)
Neri di Bicci (1418/1420–1492) 
Neroccio de' Landi (1447–1500) 
Niccolò di Liberatore (l'Alunno) (1430–1502)
Emilio Notti (1891–1982)
Pietro Novelli (1603–1647) 
Allegretto Nuzi (1315–1373)

O

Marco d'Oggiono (c. 1470–c. 1549)
Orcagna (Andrea di Cione) (1310–1368)
Lelio Orsi (1511–1587)

P

Pacino di Buonaguida (1280–1340)
Paolo Pagani (1655–1716)
Luigi Pagano (19th-century)
Arturo Pagliai (1852–1896)
Eleuterio Pagliano (1826–1903)
Gioacchino Pagliei (1852–1896)
Arcangela Paladini (1599–1622)
Palma il Giovane (1548/1550–1628)
Palma il Vecchio (1480–1528)
Marco Palmezzano (1460–1539)
Giovanni Paolo Panini (1691–1765)
Paolo Veneziano (1300–1365)
Alessandro Papetti (born 1958)
Napoleone Parisani (1854–1932)
Parmigianino (1503–1540)
Ferdinando Partini (active 1790s)
Luigia Pascoli (1835–1885)
Bartolomeo Passarotti (1529–1592)
Domenico Passignano (1559–1638)
Giovanni Antonio Pellegrini (1675–1741)
Itala Pellegrino (born 1865)
Giuseppe Pellizza da Volpedo (1868–1907)
Odoardo Perini (1671–1757)
Perugino (c. 1445–1523)
Simone Peterzano (1535–1599)
Vincenzo Petrocelli (1825–1896)
Umberto Pettinicchio (born 1943)
Pietro Pezzati (1828–1890)
Baldassare Peruzzi (1481–1537)
Pesellino (1422–1457)
Giovanni Piancastelli (1845–1926)
Piero della Francesca (c.1416–1492)
Piero di Cosimo (1462–1522)
Giovanni Battista Piazzetta (1683–1754)
Nicola di Pietro (14th century)
Domenico Piola (1627–1703)
Pinturicchio (1454–1513)
Sebastiano del Piombo (c. 1485–1547)
Fausto Pirandello (1899–1975)
Giuseppe Pirovani (c. 1755–c. 1835) 
Pisanello (1395–1455)
Michelangelo Pittatore (1825–1903)
Giambattista Pittoni (1687–1767) 
Karl Plattner (1919–1986)
Antonio del Pollaiuolo (c. 1429/1433–1498)
Piero del Pollaiuolo (1443–1496)
Giovanni Pietro de Pomis (c.1565–1633)
Giovanni dal Ponte (1385–1438)
Pontormo (1494–1556)
Antonio Porcelli (1800–1870)
Francesco Porcia (1531–1612)
il Pordenone (1483–1539)
Gregorio Porideo (16th century)
Daniello Porri (16th century)
Aniello Portio (fl. 1690–1700)
Andrea Pozzo (1642–1709)
Alessandro Prampolino (1827–1865)
Ranunzio Prata (fl. 1635)
Luigi Premazzi (1814–1891)
Mattia Preti (1613–1699)
Pier Francesco Prina (18th century)
Giulio Cesare Procaccini (1574–1625)
Stefano Provenzali (17th century)
Mario Puccini (1869–1920)
Antonio Puglicochi (17th century)

Q

Giovanni Battista Quadrone (1844–1898)

R

Prospero Rabaglio (16th century)
Raffaele Rabbia (fl. 1610)
Ambrogio Raffaele (1845-1928)
Domenico Rainaldi (fl. 1665)
Giovanni Battista Ramacciotti (17th century)
Laudadio Rambaldo (fl. 1386)
Raphael (1483–1520)
Francesco Redenti (1820–1876)
Tommaso Redi (1665–1726)
Bernardo Regoliron (18th century)
Guido Reni (1575–1642)
Cesare Reverdino (fl. 1531–1564)
Angelo Ribossi (1822-1886)
Marco Ricchiedeo (16th century)
Giovanni Battista Ricci (1537–1627)
Sebastiano Ricci (1659–1734)
Antonio Riccianti (17th century)
Galeazzo Rivelli (14th century)
Ercole de' Roberti (1451–1496)
Marietta Robusti (c. 1560–1590)
Pietro Ròi (1819–1896)
Romanino (1485–1566)
Giulio Romano (1499–1546)
Alessandro Rontini (1854–1933)
Salvator Rosa (1615–1673)
Cosimo Rosselli (1439–after 1506)
Rosso Fiorentino (1494–1540)
Antonio Rotta (1828–1903)
Guido Ruggeri (fl. c. 1550s)
Benedetto Rusconi "il Diana" (1460–1525)
Clemente Ruta (1668–1767)
Pietro Ruzolone (d. 1517)

S

Lorenzo Sabatini (1530–1576) 
Andrea Sacchi (1599–1661) 
Giorgio Salmoiraghi (1936–2022)
Marco Sammartino (17th century)
Domingo Maria Sanni (18th century)
Sano di Pietro (1406–1481) 
Fabrizio Santafede (1560–1623/28)
Santi di Tito (1536–1603) 
Giovanni Santi (1435–1494)
Girolamo Santo (16th century)
Carlo Saraceni (1579–1620)
Giuseppe Sartori (1863–1922)
Andrea del Sarto (1486–1530)
Sassetta, Stefano di Giovanni (1392–1450)
Giovanni Battista Salvi da Sassoferrato (1609–1685)
Girolamo Savoldo (1480–after 1548)
Francesco Scarpinato (1840–1895)
Bartolomeo Schedoni (1578–1615)
Alessandro Scorzoni (1858–1933)
Antonino Sartini (1889–1954)
Luigi Scaffai (1837-1899)
Scipione (Gino Bonichi) (1904–1933)
Giovanni Segantini (1858–1899)
Jacopo da Sellaio (1441–1493)
Luigi Serena (1855–1911)
Ernesto Serra (1860–1915)
Andrea Sguazella (16th century)
Luca Signorelli (1445–1523)
Telemaco Signorini (1835–1901)
Nicola Simbari (1927–2012)
Salvatore Simoncini (late 19th century)
Simone dei Crocifissi (1330–1399)
Mario Sironi (1885–1961)
Sodoma (1477–1549)
Andrea Solari (1460–1524)
Giuseppe Solenghi (1879–1944)
Francesco Solimena (1657–1747)
Domenico Someda (1859–1944)
Napoleone Sommaruga (1848–1906)
Lionello Spada (1576–1622)
Micco Spadaro aka Domenico Gargiulo (1609/1610–ca. 1675) 
Giovanni Martino Spanzotti (1455–1528)
Spinello Aretino (1350–1410)
Francesco Squarcione (c. 1395–1468)
Giovanni Stanchi (1608–c. 1675)
Gherardo Starnina (1354–1413)
Stefano da Verona (1379–1438)
Bernardo Strozzi (1581–1644)

T

Francesco Tacconi (15th century)
Taddeo di Bartolo (1363–1422)
Spurius Tadius (1st century BC and 1st century AD)
Giovanni Temini (fl. 1622)
Giovanni Battista Tiepolo (1696–1770)
Giovanni Domenico Tiepolo (1727–1804)
Tintoretto (1518–1594)
Benvenuto Tisi(il Garofalo) (1481–1559)
Titian (1488–1576)
Antonio Tognone (16th century)
Giulio Tonduzzi (c.1513–c.1583) 
Bartolommeo Torre (17th century)
Francesco Traballesi (1541–1588)
Gaspare Traversi (1722–1770)
Giacomo Trécourt (1812–1882)
Euclide Trotti (16th century)
Giovanni Maria Tucci (fl. 1542)
Cosimo Tura (c. 1430–1495)

U

Paolo Uccello (c. 1396–1475)
Ugolino di Nerio (1280–1335)

V

Perino del Vaga (1501–1547)
Andrea Vanni (1332–c. 1414) 
Tanzio da Varallo (c. 1575/1580–c. 1632/1633)
Giorgio Vasari (1511–1574)
Francesco Veau (1727–1768)
Giovanni de' Vecchi (1536–1614)
Benedetto Velli (17th century)
Giovanni Vendramini (1769–1839) 
Giuseppe Vermiglio (1585–1635)
Filippo da Verona (fl. 1509–1514)
Niccolò Da Verona (15th century)
Paolo Veronese (1528–1588)
Andrea del Verrocchio (c. 1435–1488)
Francesco Vicentino (16th century)
Leonardo da Vinci (1452–1519)
Lauretta Vinciarelli (1943–2011) 
Jacopo Vignali (1592–1664)
Vitale da Bologna (1300–1360)
Matteo di Vittore (16th century)
Bernardino Vitulini (c. 1350)
Alvise Vivarini (1442/53–1505) 
Antonio Vivarini (1418–1476/84) 
Bartolomeo Vivarini (1430–1491)
Antonio Diego Voci (1920–1985)
Vincenzo Volpe (1855–1929)
Giovanni Battista di Pietro di Stefano Volponi (16th century)

W
Carlo Wostry (1865–1943)

Z

Alessandro Zaffonato (fl. 1730)
Domenico Zampieri (1581–1641)
Federico Zandomeneghi (1841–1917)
Giuseppe Miti Zanetti (1859–1929)
Bernardo Zenale (c. 1460–1526)
Marco Zoppo (1433–1498)
Francesco Zuccarelli (1702–1789)
Federico Zuccari (1542–1609)
Francesco Zugno (1709–1787)
Sergio Zanni (born 1942)

See also

 List of Italians
 List of Milanese painters

References

Painters
Italian